General elections were held in Sweden on 20 September 1964. The Swedish Social Democratic Party remained the largest party, winning 113 of the 233 seats in the Andra kammaren of the Riksdag. Tage Erlander's Social Democratic government was returned to power.

Results

Notes

References

General elections in Sweden
Sweden
General election
Sweden